Pterygium unguis (or dorsal pterygium) forms as a result of scarring between the proximal nailfold and matrix, with the classic example being lichen planus, though it has been reported to occur as a result of sarcoidosis and Hansen's disease.

See also
 Pterygium inversum unguis
 Nail
 List of cutaneous conditions

References

Conditions of the skin appendages